Goat Marsh Research Natural Area is a  research natural area located southwest of Mount St. Helens and within Mount St. Helens National Volcanic Monument. The natural area is composed of wetlands, young conifer forests growing in volcanic soils, and old-growth stands of superlative Noble Fir and Douglas Fir.

The area has been identified as a region of scientific importance and preserved for ecological research due to its recent volcanic history as well as for its large tracts of mature and undisturbed Noble Fir forest.

The wetland and Lodgepole Pine forest ecosystems of Goat Marsh RNA were established in between approximately 1550 and 1700 C.E. when pyroclastic flows triggered by the eruption of Mount St. Helens disrupted the hydrology of Cold Springs Creek.

The remaining  located on the northern edge of the NRA is dominated by a 350 year old forest of Noble Fir and Douglas Fir that were spared by recent volcanic eruptions.

Goat Marsh RNA contains many of the largest and tallest remaining specimens of Noble Fir, including the "Goat Marsh Giant" (272 ft height, 8.3 ft DBH, 4,430 cubic feet volume), "Riker!" (253 ft height, 7.3 ft DBH, 3,810 cubic feet volume) and an unnamed fir 295 feet tall. This relatively small area of forest also contains Douglas Fir measured at over 300 feet in height.

Other conifers common within Goat Marsh RNA include Western Hemlock, Pacific Silver Fir, and Western Redcedar. Common understory vegetation includes Vine Maple, Vanilla-leaf, and Redwood sorel. Wetland vegetation includes various species of sedges and grasses.

References 

Wilderness areas of Washington (state)
Research forests
Forests of Washington (state)
Protected areas of Cowlitz County, Washington